"Josie" (sometimes subtitled "Everything's Gonna Be Fine") is a song by American rock band Blink-182, released on November 17, 1998, as the fourth single from the group's second studio album, Dude Ranch (1997). "Josie" was primarily written by bassist Mark Hoppus about an idealized girlfriend, and the song includes references to the bands Unwritten Law and Dance Hall Crashers, bands the trio toured with between 1995 and 1996.

The single, which was remixed by Tom Lord-Alge, reached number 31 in Australia. The single remix of "Josie" was later featured on the band's Greatest Hits. The music video for "Josie" stars Alyssa Milano as the object of Hoppus' affection in a high school setting. The original video was to depict the band performing on a sinking cruise liner, but the video was scrapped after filming.

It is the band's last single to feature drummer Scott Raynor.

Background
"Josie" is an ode to the perfect relationship companion. Bassist Mark Hoppus wrote the song imagining the ideal girlfriend; "It is about a common feeling that everyone can understand, which is being stoked on a girl," Hoppus told Billboard in 1998. Though the song is fictional, it was named after a dog owned by Elyse Rogers, vocalist for ska-punk quartet Dance Hall Crashers, whom Hoppus dated in the mid-1990s. Hoppus namedrops the band, as well as fellow Poway pop-punkers Unwritten Law, in the lyric "My girlfriend likes UL and DHC". The trio recorded a demo of the song with Warren Fitzgerald of the Vandals; this edition is featured in the 1996 surf film Drifting, directed by filmmaker Taylor Steele.

Its final version was recorded with producer Mark Trombino for the band's second album, Dude Ranch, between 1996–97. The song also alludes to Sombrero Mexican Food, a restaurant chain in San Diego, that the trio ate at frequently when recording. The group later partnered with the chain with the lyrics emblazoned on shirts. The band wrote a sequel to the song, "Online Songs", for their 2001 album Take Off Your Pants and Jacket.

The song is composed in the key of B major and is set in time signature of common time with a very fast tempo of 200 beats per minute. Hoppus's vocal range spans from G#3 to F#4. In Australia, the song spent eight weeks in the top 50 and 24 weeks in the top 100, where it peaked at number 31 on July 6.

Music video

For the group's third music video, the band attempted to take a more serious route and turned to director Jason Matzner and his collaborator Brendan Lambe. Hoppus' original idea was that the band would be playing on the deck of an old cruise liner as it sank. The band would play in real time as everything around them exploded in slow motion. Gradually, the ship would reach catastrophe ("people running, sparks flying, superstructure collapsing") before the ship sinks into the dark waters as the songs ends with the line "everything's gonna be fine." As that video would have cost the band's label, MCA, millions of dollars, an alternative was settled on: the band is performing in a basement when one musician hits a pipe with his guitar, causing the room to flood. The video was shot in the Universal Studios Lot and was director Matzner's first video. "Filming the first 'Josie' video was awful," Hoppus remembered in 2000. "We had to bring old equipment that we were willing to ruin." The trio were unhappy with the shockingly cold water, and DeLonge cut his head open on shrapnel that was floating around in water. When the band received the first edit, the band members decided to scrap it and start over. A snippet of the original video surfaced online in 2011.

The final music video for "Josie" was directed by Darren Doane, who also shot the videos for "M+M's" and "Dammit". The video depicts the members as students at secondary school, and stars Alyssa Milano as the object of Hoppus' affection. "Josie" did not receive extensive MTV play, unlike its predecessor. The clip was filmed at Westlake High School, in Thousand Oaks, California. Though the trio play adolescents in the video, they were far from high school: Hoppus was 25 when he filmed the clip. A food fight scene was completed in one take by necessity, as the cafeteria was destroyed afterward. "All those kids had to sit around all day outside in the summer and, at the end of the day, they were rewarded by letting them nail us with tons of food," said Hoppus. In contrast to the song's point, the video has been interpreted as preoccupied with homosociality: scenes take place in locker rooms, and one male student confuses a paper airplane love note as intended for him. Spencer Kornhaber, writing for The Atlantic, mentions those moments in context with the band's public image: "The truth is that the band members weren't bored with sex; it's just that their own bromance often fascinated them more."

Reception
"Josie" was one of the band's first breakout hits, preceded by the album's main single, "Dammit". While not one of the band's best-known singles, "Josie" remains a fan favorite. Music critics have complimented the song. Maria Sherman of Rolling Stone observed the "sweet" song's comical tone "conceal[s] real poignancy." Molly Lambert at MTV described the tune as a summary of "that totally crushed-out teenage feeling [...] That deeply romantic streak is what set Blink-182 apart." Chris Payne, writing for Billboard in 2023, called it a "holy text" of the genre and included it as its third-best love song, remarking, "'Josie' set the mold for the modern pop-punk love song"; in another ranking, he included it among the best singles of 1998. Matt Mitchell of Paste included it among the band's greatest, commenting: "The pedestal he's put his unnamed lover on is problematic in how it idealizes her, but there’s a subtle adoration alive here that still makes the track sing."

The song was covered by singer-songwriter Colleen Green in 2019, and by indie rock band Adult Mom in 2020.

Format and track listing 
US CD (1998)
 "Josie" (Tom Lord-Alge remix; radio edit) – 3:06
 "Wasting Time" – 2:44
 "Carousel" – 3:12
 "I Won't Be Home for Christmas" – 3:17

Australian CD (1998)
 "Josie" (Tom Lord-Alge remix) – 3:23
 "Untitled" (Live) – 3:05
 "Dammit" (Live) – 2:58
 "Does My Breath Smell?" (Live) – 2:25
 "Wasting Time" (Live) – 4:06

The versions of "Josie" released for radio were remixed by Tom Lord-Alge; the Australian CD features the full version while the US CD contains the shorter radio edit. The live tracks on the Australian CD single were recorded at dates on Warped Tour 1997.

Charts

References

Notes

External links

Blink-182 songs
1997 songs
1998 singles
Songs written by Mark Hoppus
Songs written by Tom DeLonge
Songs written by Scott Raynor
MCA Records singles